The following state highways in the U.S. state of California are entirely or partially unconstructed; in other words, their routings have been defined by state law, but no route has been adopted by the California Department of Transportation (Caltrans).

1–99 

State Route 11 is a planned 3-mile (4.8 km) tolled route, running southeast from near the junction of SR 905 and SR 125 to a future Mexican border crossing east of Otay Mesa. The first phase of the highway from SR 905 to Enrico Fermi Drive opened on March 19, 2016.

The westernmost 9.2 miles (14.8 km) of State Route 12 are unconstructed, from SR 116 in Sebastopol west to SR 1. This would be today's Bodega Highway and Freestone-Valley Ford Road, but Caltrans has no plans to take them over.

The south end of State Route 13 is unconstructed, extending 4.5 miles (7.2 km) beyond I-580 to SR 61 near the Oakland International Airport. A very short piece at the north end has also not been built, extending west into the San Francisco Bay to the unconstructed SR 61 freeway.

A 21.8-mile (35.1 km) extension of State Route 14 from the Newhall Pass interchange with I-5 south to SR 1 northwest of Santa Monica was once proposed as the Reseda Freeway. The postmiles on the existing alignment reflect the existence of this unconstructed segment, but the new exit numbers on State Route 14 suggest this segment has been abandoned. The section between US 101 and SR 118 would be Reseda Boulevard, but Caltrans has no plans to take it over.

State Route 18 is unconstructed from its end at SR 210 in San Bernardino south to I-10, a distance of 4.1 miles (6.6 km). This section would be Waterman Avenue, but Caltrans has no plans to take it over.

A 15.1-mile (24.3 km) eastern extension of State Route 24 from I-680 at Walnut Creek to SR 4 near Pittsburg is unconstructed. It is today's Ygnacio Valley Road, Kirker Pass Road and Railroad Avenue.

Originally, the route overlapped I-680 through Walnut Creek and split off and connect to SR 4 in Concord. The route continued along State Route 4 from the current intersection of 242 to the Antioch Bridge, continuing along the river road to Sacramento, currently State Route 160, then continuing north to Woodland, Marysville, Oroville, along the North Fork of the Feather River to a junction with State Route 89 (this segment is currently State Route 70), where it continued dual-numbered with 89 through Quincy. Highway 24 split from 89 near Graeagle, and continued east through Portola east until its terminus at U.S. Route 395. Parts of the same route were also sometimes designated as State Route 84. SR 24 was truncated to I-680 by 1987 and the segment in Concord was renumbered SR 242.

The eastern segment of State Route 36, stretching 17.0 miles (27.4 km) from SR 139 north of Susanville east to US 395 near Termo, was unconstructed until it was deleted from the legislative definition in 1998. A locally-maintained route is S. Grasshopper Road, Westside Road, and Fillman Road, but it was not built on a proper alignment for construction as a state highway, and there were no plans for a freeway or expressway. It was still listed in the 2002 report.

An unconstructed 11.2-mile (18.0 km) western extension of State Route 37 runs from US 101 near Novato to SR 1 near Nicasio. A locally maintained traversable route is Point Reyes-Petaluma Road and Novato Boulevard, but Caltrans has no plans to take it over.

11.4 miles (18.3 km) of State Route 39 are unconstructed, from Harbor Boulevard and Whittier Avenue in La Habra north to I-10 in Azusa. However, Section 339(c) of the California Streets and Highways Code designates Harbor Boulevard and Azusa Avenue to be on the corridor between the two existing segments. As yet, the California Transportation Commission, as empowered in Section 75(a) of the California Streets and Highways Code, has not adopted the Harbor Boulevard-Azusa Avenue link. It is noted that an END Route 39 sign exists at the intersection of Whittier Boulevard and Harbor Boulevard.  In addition, the northernmost 4.5 miles of Route 39, in the Angeles National Forest between 1.8 miles north of Crystal Lake Road and Route 2 at Islip Saddle, have been closed since a 1978 landslide.

State Route 47 is constructed as a freeway from I-110 in San Pedro east and north to the split with SR 103. The 1.2-mile (1.9 km) segment along Ocean Boulevard is currently being upgraded, and the 7.6-mile (12.2 km) portion along Henry Ford Avenue and Alameda Street north to SR 91 has been upgraded as part of the Alameda Corridor Project, existing as a mostly below-grade surface street. Caltrans has no plans for the remainder of the legislated route, stretching 8.6 miles (13.8 km) north from SR 91 to I-10 near downtown Los Angeles.

State Route 48 is completely unconstructed, stretching 8.5 miles (13.7 km) from the northern junction of SR 14 and SR 138 near Lancaster east to proposed SR 122.

SR 48 was originally planned to run from Ridge Route Road (approximately four miles east of Interstate 5) near Quail Lake in Los Angeles County to SR 122 near the Los Angeles / San Bernardino County Line. The segment between Ridge Route Road and SR 14 was signed as SR 138, which was defined on a southeasterly course through or paralleling Oakdale and Pine Canyons to meet SR 14 in Palmdale opposite the easterly continuation of Route 138. The planned rerouting was known as the Metropolitan Bypass Freeway. In 1965, because of constructability issues on the proposed realignment of Route 138 through or near Oakdale and Pine Canyons, the proposed junction, and thus the west end of SR 48, was moved east to 170th Street West. In 1996, the segment of SR 48 between 170th Street West and SR 14 was transferred to SR 138, leaving only the unconstructed portion. A locally maintained traversable route is East Avenue E, but Caltrans has no plans to take it over.

State Route 56 is unconstructed from I-15 east through Poway to SR 67.

A southerly extension of State Route 57, stretching 13.0 miles (20.9 km) from SR 22 near Santa Ana south to SR 1 near Huntington Beach, is unconstructed.

A total of 24.3 miles (39.1 km) of State Route 61 are unconstructed, running south from SR 112 near San Leandro to SR 84 near Newark and north from SR 260 in Alameda to I-580 near Albany.

State Route 64 is an unconstructed highway connecting SR 1 near Malibu Beach with I-5 at SR 170 south of San Fernando. It was legislated in 1959 as Route 265, and renumbered Route 64 in 1964. It was proposed as a 30.9-mile freeway. The section from SR 1 to US 101 was deleted from the Freeway and Expressway system on November 23, 1970. The remainder was deleted from the Freeway and Expressway system on January 1, 1976. A locally maintained traversable route is Malibu Canyon Road, Las Virgenes Road, Bell Canyon Fire Road, Saddlebow Road, Bell Canyon Road, Valley Circle Boulevard, Roscoe Boulevard, and Tuxford Street, but Caltrans has no plans to take it over. The route concept report recommends deletion of the route from the highway system.

Over two-thirds of State Route 65 is a proposed route through the eastern San Joaquin Valley, splitting the maintained route in two. This unconstructed highway stretches 215.9 miles (347.5 km) from SR 198 near Exeter to I-80 in Roseville. It was signed on Sunrise Boulevard with U.S. 50 until 1976. However, with the projected growth of the Central Valley, interest has reemerged in constructing all or part of the unconstructed portion of SR 65, at least as far north as an unconstructed eastern extension of SR 152. There is also another small unconstructed segment at the north end, extending west from its terminus at SR 70 to SR 99.

The eastern end of State Route 74 from SR 111 in Palm Desert north 5.5 miles (8.9 km) to I-10 was unconstructed until it was relinquished and deleted from the legislative definition in 2013. It was planned on Monterey Avenue.

State Route 77 presently stretches only 0.4 miles (0.6 km) from I-880 northeast to SR 185 in Oakland. A 13.4-mile (21.6 km) extension is unconstructed, running generally northeast to SR 24 near Lafayette. It is to follow 42nd Avenue, High Street, 35th Avenue, Redwood Road, Pinehurst Road, and Canyon Road, and to be a freeway north of SR 93/Moraga Way.

State Route 81 is an entirely-unconstructed 30.9-mile (49.7 km) freeway from I-215 southeast of Riverside west and north around the south and west sides of Riverside to I-15 south of Devore. Although the legislation noted that Sierra Avenue is Route 81, it is not signed as Route 81 and doesn't appear to be formally part of the route. The route was defined in 1959 as Legislative Route 276 and renumbered to Route 81 in 1964.

A 13-mile (21 km) piece in the middle of State Route 84 is unconstructed, stretching north from I-580 in Livermore to SR 4 near Brentwood. A traversable route is Vasco Road. The section between SR 4 and SR 12 is concurrent with SR 160. The Mid-State Tollway, if built, will be built from I-680 to SR 4 and will most likely be designated SR 84, and the spur will mostly likely be designated SR 239.

An unconstructed northern extension of State Route 87 runs from the present end at US 101 to SR 237 near Alviso. A locally maintained traversable route is Charcot Avenue and North First Street.

It once extended to Interstate 480 (which itself became SR 480 in 1968 and was cancelled in 1991) in San Francisco as a proposed highway east of US 101. In 1968, SR 87's north end was truncated to I-280, as the section west of I-280 was transferred to I-80; the old route of I-80 became SR 241, which was cancelled in 1972 due to environmental concerns. In 1970, the section from I-280 to SR 230 was transferred to SR 230. The section from SR 230 to SR 238 was cancelled due to environmental concerns. In 1980, the section from SR 238 to SR 237 was cancelled due to environmental concerns.

The central portion of State Route 90 is unsigned or unconstructed, stretching from I-405 east to SR 39. It is Slauson Avenue, Mulberry Drive, La Mirada Boulevard, and Imperial Highway. The route concept report recommends deletion of Route 90 from the state highway system from unsigned or unconstructed Route 258 to the Orange County line (and possibly renumbering one of the sections).

State Route 92 had a 2.2-mile (3.5 km) unconstructed segment from its current terminus at SR 238 to I-580 until 2015, when that segment was deleted from the legislative definition. A locally maintained traversable route is A Street and Grove Way, which Caltrans has no plans to take over.

All of State Route 93 is unconstructed, on a 17.9-mile (28.8 km) route from the proposed SR 77 near Moraga northwest, west, and southwest to I-580 in Richmond. It is Moraga Way, Camino Pablo, San Pablo Dam Road, and an undetermined routing from there, but Caltrans has no plans to take it over; however, Richmond Parkway is proposed to be designated as SR 93, as callboxes are signed CC-93.

100–199 
State Route 100 is a completely unconstructed beachfront loop in Santa Cruz, stretching 4.5 miles (7.2 km) from SR 1 west of downtown to SR 1 near SR 17. It was proposed as a freeway, but in August 1975, the freeway was cancelled due to local opposition.

State Route 102 is a 37.5-mile (60.4 km) unconstructed freeway that would generally parallel I-80, beginning at I-5 near SR 99 north of Sacramento and heading east across I-80 and northeast to I-80 near Auburn. It is currently in the design process.

8.3 miles (13.4 km) of State Route 104 are unconstructed, stretching east from SR 49 near Amador City to SR 88 near Pine Grove. It is Ridge Road and Climax Road, and Caltrans is planning to take it over.

A 21.5-mile (34.6 km) extension of State Route 108 is unconstructed, from its present west end at SR 132 in Modesto southwest to I-5 near Crows Landing. This is Crows Landing Road and Fink Road, which the county wants Caltrans to take over, but Caltrans has no plans to do so.

A 10.5-mile (16.9 km) eastern segment of State Route 118 is unconstructed, running from I-210 near Sunland east to proposed SR 249 north of La Cañada Flintridge. A locally maintained traversable route is I-210 and Big Tujunga Canyon Road, but Caltrans has no plans to take it over.

State Route 122 is a completely unconstructed 61.3-mile (98.7 km) freeway, defined to run from SR 14 south of Palmdale northeast and east past the east end of proposed SR 48 to SR 58 west of Barstow. A locally maintained traversable route is along Pearblossom Highway, SR 138, and 50th Street East, but Caltrans has no plans to take it over.

The portion of State Route 125 north of SR 52 in Santee is unconstructed, ending at a proposed eastern extension of SR 56 near Poway.

The easternmost 10.4-mile (16.7 km) portion of State Route 128 is unconstructed, connecting I-505 near Winters (the current end) with SR 113 near Davis. The 2002 Traversable Highways Report indicates that this segment will be considered for assumption of maintenance after a two-mile section of Russell Boulevard just east of I-505 is reconstructed. Yolo County will improve the roadway as funds permit. However, it is unclear if this ever happened.

A section of State Route 130 is unconstructed, stretching 24.8 miles from the present end at the Stanislaus County Line east to SR 33 near Patterson. A traversable route is along San Antonio Valley Road, Del Puerto Canyon Road, and Sperry Avenue. A proposed freeway path west of San Antonio Valley Road bypassing Mount Hamilton from either to the north toward State Route 237 or to the south toward San Jose's Evergreen district to I-5 was planned but feasibility of the project came into question, however, as constructing a freeway over the Diablo Range near three of its highest peaks (Mount Hamilton included) and across the Calaveras Fault would have been very difficult. The project also faced stiff opposition from taxpayers, environmentalists, residents of the area looking to preserve their area's local charm, and the Lick Observatory. (A freeway through the mountains near the observatory would render it useless due to light pollution.) The freeway plan was quietly abandoned as a result in 2006.

For unknown reasons, State Route 133 was erroneously listed as unconstructed until it was corrected as not being a freeway in 1999. It was still listed in the 2002 report.

State Route 138 had an unconstructed section along Ridge Route Road and Elizabeth Lake Road to State Route 14; current routing east of Ridge Route Road to SR 14 was SR 48. In 1965, SR 138 was rerouted along a section of SR 48 from Ridge Route Road to 170th Street West because of constructability issues, removing one unconstructed portion. In 1996, SR 138 was rerouted along another section of SR 48 from 170th Street west to SR 14, removing the remainder of the unconstructed portion.

The eastern segment of State Route 142, the 9.5-mile (15.3 km) Carbon Canyon Freeway, is unconstructed, running from SR 71 near Chino to SR 210 near Upland.

State Route 143 is a 19.7-mile (31.7 km) unconstructed highway of Sacramento, beginning at SR 99 near Elk Grove and ending at the east end of SR 244 near Carmichael. In 1994, it extended north, replacing a section of SR 244, to Auburn Boulevard. It was proposed as a freeway, but that was cancelled in 1975 due to opposition. The existing arterials Grant Line Road and Bradshaw Road approximating the route are currently utilized, and in 2002 Caltrans recommended removing the route definition from the state highway system (but this never appeared to happen).

State Route 148 is an unconstructed highway of Sacramento, stretching 16.3 miles (26.2 km) from I-5 east to proposed SR 65. It was proposed as a freeway, but that was cancelled in 1975 due to opposition. The City of Sacramento proposed Cosumnes River Boulevard and Calvine Road for this highway. In 2002, Caltrans recommended removing the route definition from the state highway system (but this never appeared to happen). In 2010, the freeway option was brought back as the Capital Southeast Connector. It is under construction.

A 15.1-mile (24.3 km) easterly extension of State Route 152 is unconstructed, connecting the current east end at SR 99 near Chowchilla with proposed SR 65.

State Route 157, which was proposed from I-805 near Ocean View Boulevard in San Diego to SR 125 near the Sweetwater Reservoir, was unconstructed until it was deleted in 1994.

A 62.9-mile (101.2 km) portion in the middle of State Route 162, between Covelo and Elk Creek, is unconstructed. It is Mendocino Pass Road and Alder Springs Road, and Caltrans is taking it over, with signage being put up.

The southernmost 1.4 mile (2.3 km) of State Route 164 is unconstructed, connecting SR 19 with I-605 near Pico Rivera. This section is the proposed Rio Hondo Freeway.

An 18.2-mile (29.3 km) portion in the middle of State Route 169 along the Klamath River is unconstructed, between Klamath Glen and Johnsons. This is due to the flooding. Caltrans has completed a feasibility study for this section.

 The section of State Route 170 that was supposed to be the  Laurel Canyon Freeway, which would have run from the Los Angeles International Airport to the San Fernando Valley via the Santa Monica Mountains, was unconstructed until it was deleted from the legislative definition in 2015. A locally maintained traversable route is Laurel Canyon Boulevard, Crescent Heights Boulevard and La Cienega Boulevard, which Caltrans has no plans to take over.

State Route 171, which was proposed from I-5 near San Diego to I-805, was unconstructed until it was deleted in 1994.

56.0 miles (90.1 km) of State Route 178 is unconstructed, from east of Ridgecrest to Death Valley National Park. The "traversable" route is a winding dirt road through mountain passes in a desolate area. It passes through the gunnery range of the China Lake Naval Weapons Center and through the Wingate Wash area (a National Park Service designated wilderness area). The area is not suitable for a state highway, and District 9 recommends it be rerouted or deleted from the state highway system (and one of the sections possibly renumbered).

State Route 179 is a 13.8-mile (22.2 km) routing along Cherry Glen Rd and Pleasants Valley Rd, connecting I-80 near Vacaville with SR 128 near Lake Berryessa.

State Route 180 is unconstructed from its present end at SR 33 in Mendota west to I-5, and from I-5 west to SR 25 near Paicines, a total of 81.2 miles (130.7 km). This would be along Panoche Road, Little Panoche Road, Shields Avenue, Fairfax Avenue, and Belmont Avenue, but Caltrans has no plans to take it over.

State Route 181 is an entirely unconstructed 9.5-mile (15.3 km) route, from SR 116 near Forestville to US 101 north of Santa Rosa. A locally maintained traversable route has been defined via Mirabel Road and River Road, but Caltrans has no plans to take it over.

The central portion of State Route 190 is unconstructed, stretching 43.0 miles (69.2 km) from Quaking Aspen in the Sequoia National Forest to US 395 at Olancha. On June 25, 1982, deleting the unconstructed section was recommended, but nothing ever happened. District 9 recommends deleting the unconstructed portion (and possibly renumbering one of the sections).

200–999 
State Route 211, formerly part of SR 1, stretches only 5 miles (8 km) from US 101 near Fernbridge to Ferndale. A locally maintained traversable route, which the state does not plan to take over, continues south from Ferndale for 102.8 miles (165.4 km) along Mattole Road, Wilder Ridge Road, Kings Peak Road, Chemise Mountain Road, and Usal Road to SR 1 near Rockport.

Until recently, State Route 213 had an unconstructed section from I-405 to Carson Street. Caltrans took over Western Avenue between these points, and signed and designated it as SR 213, making it completely constructed.

A 5.0-mile (8.0 km) western extension of State Route 217 is unconstructed, leading from the present end at the University of California at Santa Barbara northwest to US 101.

The southern end of State Route 227 is unconstructed, stretching 1.7 miles (2.7 km) from US 101 in Arroyo Grande to SR 1 east of Oceano. There is no locally maintained traversable route, but there is a proposed routing.

State Route 228 was a 2.5-mile unconstructed route between SR 86 2.5 miles southwest of Brawley and SR 86 west of Brawley. Its routing would roughly have been a continuation of Imperial Avenue north to near Kalin Avenue, bypassing downtown Brawley. It was deleted in 1998, but was still listed in the 2002 report.

State Route 230 is a 4.1-mile (6.6 km) completely unconstructed route in southeastern San Francisco and San Mateo County, linking US 101 with I-280 along the San Francisco Bay. Except for the southern end, the route was part of SR 87 until 1970, when SR 87 was cancelled north of SR 237. Some of the plans for a Southern Crossing across the bay would have used SR 230. It was proposed as a freeway, but the freeway option was cancelled on October 21, 1976 due to opposition.

State Route 234 and State Route 235 are unconstructed southern and northern bypasses of Stockton, each linking I-5 with SR 99. Caltrans has no plans to build either, but has identified locally-maintained traversable routes: French Camp Road for the 3.4-mile (5.5 km) SR 234, and Eight Mile Road for the 6.4-mile (10.3 km) SR 235. However, one Caltrans map makes the route of SR 234 appear to be Arch-Airport Road. On November 29, 1993, San Joaquin County adopted Eight Mile Road as an arterial highway and dropped interest in it as a state highway.

A northern extension of State Route 238 is unconstructed, stretching west 1.6 miles (2.6 km) from the end of I-238 at I-880 to proposed SR 61 near San Lorenzo. A locally maintained traversable route is along Lewelling Boulevard. The entire route was a proposed freeway and was sent to the Interstate Highway System in October 1968 but was rejected. Then after a series of lawsuits and appeals, the freeway plan was canceled in 2003 and Caltrans sold off the property it had acquired in the name of eminent domain along the proposed route. A bridge over I-680 in Fremont that had already been constructed to serve the route was demolished as a result.

State Route 239 is a 17-mile (27.4 km) unconstructed route that would link I-580 at I-205 west of Tracy with SR 4 near Brentwood. Caltrans has identified Mountain House Road and Byron Highway (CR J4) as a traversable route, but has no plans to maintain it. In 2005, the federal legislation known as SAFETEA-LU provided $14 million for the purpose of studying the route's corridor and funding its construction. The spur of the Mid-State Tollway, if built, will most likely be designated as SR 239, while the main tollway will most likely be designated as SR 84.

The south end of State Route 241, from Oso Parkway south to I-5 near San Clemente, is currently in the planning stages. The section from Oso Parkway to Cow Camp Road near SR 74 is currently under construction while the remainder of the extension is still under discussion.

Until 1994, State Route 244 included an unconstructed extension from Auburn Boulevard east to Fair Oaks Boulevard in Sacramento County. This was transferred to SR 143.

State Route 249 is a 13.5-mile (21.7 km) unconstructed route that would connect SR 2 north of La Cañada Flintridge with SR 14 south of Palmdale. Angeles Forest Highway (CR N3) follows the general alignment, but Caltrans has no plans to take it over. However, there are plans to explore the building of this route between Palmdale and Los Angeles tunneling through the mountains.

State Route 251 is a completely unconstructed route, defined to extend from I-580 near San Quentin, California to SR 1 near Point Reyes Station. The 1.6-mile (2.6 km) portion east of US 101 was defined in 1959 to be Legislative Route 251 and it kept its number. This section was proposed by Caltrans to be improved and signed as SR 251, but that never happened. Now Caltrans has no plans to take over that section. The rest was the proposed 22.9-mile (36.9 km) Point Reyes Freeway, and was part of SR 17 until 1984, when SR 17 over the Richmond-San Rafael Bridge became I-580.

Sir Francis Drake Boulevard roughly parallels the highway's length. If built, the highway was probably going to be called the "Point Reyes Freeway"; extra flyover ramps at the Sir Francis Drake Boulevard-U.S. 101 interchange suggest this.

The freeway was born due to an idea to develop west Marin County, a traditionally rural area, into a sprawling area not usually found in Marin County. With all the new residents, local roads would have been overburdened. Chief among them was Sir Francis Drake Boulevard, a two lane road from Olema to Fairfax before widening to 4 lanes as it passes through the Ross Valley.

However, the development and freeway planning were stopped due to concerns about fragile ecosystems that urbanization would have damaged or destroyed. The animals, mostly egrets and the California red-legged frog, ended up being the main reason the freeway and redevelopment was defeated. There was another problem though: the plan put the entire area on the San Andreas Fault. The decision to not redevelop West Marin made the freeway unnecessary, and it was therefore scrapped. Now, this section is Sir Francis Drake Boulevard, but Caltrans has no plans to take it over.

State Route 252, which was proposed from I-5 to I-805 (going between SR 54 and SR 94), was unconstructed until it was deleted in 1994.
 
State Route 257 is a proposed 19.6-mile (31.5 km) freeway from a proposed relocation of SR 34 east of Port Hueneme west and northwest around Oxnard to US 101 near Ventura. 5th Street and Harbor Boulevard has been identified as a traversable routing, but Caltrans has no plans to maintain the streets. It is proposed to be upgraded to a freeway.

State Route 258 is an unsigned or unconstructed route which stretches 17 miles (27.4 km) along Western Avenue from the north end of SR 213 at I-405 near Torrance north to US 101 near Hollywood. It is proposed to be upgraded to a freeway, but Caltrans has no plans to take it over. The route concept report recommends that the alignment of the route be moved 3.5 mi westerly, and it to be from I-405 near LAX to US 101 near Hollywood.

The easternmost 3.5 miles (5.6 km) of State Route 270 are unconstructed, being maintained by the California Department of Parks and Recreation inside the Bodie State Historical Park. District 9 recommended that this stretch be deleted from the state highway system.

State Route 276 is an 8.5-mile (13.7 km) unconstructed route from SR 198 near Three Rivers east to Sequoia National Park. It initially stretched further east through the park (though it was not part of the park at the time) to Mineral King, where the Walt Disney Company planned to build a recreational development. It was truncated to its current terminus in 1972. A route has been adopted. A locally maintained traversable route is Mineral King Road, or county road MTN 375, but it is not recommended for Caltrans to take it over, as this road features narrow, winding, steep grades.

State Route 280 is an unsigned surface street and an unconstructed 3.1-mile freeway extension of Interstate 280 from its current north end in San Francisco at 5th Street to Interstate 80.

The majority of State Route 281 is unconstructed, stretching 14.0 miles (22.5 km) from the current end at Clear Lake northwest to SR 29 south of Lakeport. A locally-maintained traversable route is Soda Bay Road, and Caltrans is planning to take it over.

State Route 285 was an unconstructed 8 mile route along West Street and Lake Davis Road from SR 70 in Portola to Grizzly Road. It was deleted in 1998 (due to problems with right of way and drainage), but was still listed in the 2002 report.

State Route 380, a 4.4-mile (7.1 km) western extension of I-380, was to connect the end of I-380 at I-280 in San Bruno with SR 1 near Pacifica. The freeway was cancelled on March 29, 1979. A locally maintained traversable route is along Sneath Lane, Skyline Blvd and Sharp Park Road, but Caltrans has no plans to take it over.

The middle segment of State Route 480 was unconstructed from Doyle Drive to Van Ness Avenue. It was proposed as the Golden Gate Freeway in the mid 1950s but was ultimately canceled due to the 1989 Loma Prieta earthquake as well as local opposition. The entire route was demolished and deleted in 1991 due to local opposition, approximately 2 years after the earthquake.

State Route 605 is a 3-mile (4.8 km) unconstructed southern extension of I-605 from SR 22 to SR 1 near Seal Beach. It is roughly along Seal Beach Boulevard.

The southernmost segment of Interstate 710, 3.5 miles (5.6 km) from SR 1 south and west to SR 47 on Terminal Island recently added to the legislative definition, is currently being upgraded. At the northern end, 3.5 miles (5.6 km) from Valley Boulevard north to California Boulevard in Pasadena (where a freeway stub leading to an interchange with I-210 and SR 134 already exists) has been unconstructed for several decades due to community opposition, and Caltrans recently cancelled any further study of the route.

The westernmost segment of State Route 905, 3.2 miles (5.1 km) from I-5 southwest to the Mexican border is unconstructed, and Caltrans has no plans on pursuing this routing, particularly since there are no plans for a border crossing at this location, and it is an environmentally sensitive area.

See also

 Deleted State Routes in California

References 
 California Department of Transportation, State Highway Routes: Selected Information, 1994 with 1995 revisions
 California Department of Transportation, Traversible Highways Report 2002 [sic]

External links 
 2003 Caltrans District 7 Master System Plan Status Map

High
 Unconstructed